The 1987 Women's World Championship was a snooker tournament that took place in Puckpool. It was the 1987 edition of the World Women's Snooker Championship first held in 1976.

Ann-Marie Farren won the competition, beating Stacey Hillyard 5–1 in the final.

Tournament summary
The event was sponsored by Warner who provided a total prize fund of £10,000, and the event was held at Warner's Puckpool holiday camp.

Allison Fisher was the defending champion going in to the tournament and a strong favourite to win the title again, having not lost a competitive women's snooker match since the semi-final of the 1984 World Championship against Stacey Hillyard. Hillyard had gone on to win the 1984 title, and was seeded fourth for 1987. Hillyard was to beat Fisher in the semi-final again, recovering from 1–3 down to win 4–3 in a four-hour match. In the other semi-final, second seed Ann-Marie Farren whitewashed Mandy Fisher 4–0.

Farren then took the next two frames to complete a 5–1 victory and claim the winner's prize of £3,500, and the trophy, plus a double magnum of champagne that she was not old enough to drink, being only 16 years and 48 days old at the time.

Knockout 
Players listed in bold indicate match winner. Seedings, where known, are bracketed after the players name.

Final

References

World Women's Snooker Championship
1987 in snooker
1987 in women's sport
1987 in English sport
International sports competitions hosted by England
Women's sports competitions in England